There have been five baronetcies created for persons with the surname Evans, one in the Baronetage of Ireland and four in the Baronetage of the United Kingdom. All of the baronetcies are now extinct.

The Evans Baronetcy, of Kilcreene in the County of Kilkenny, was created in the Baronetage of Ireland on 19 February 1683 for William Evans. The title became extinct on his death in 1690.

The Evans Baronetcy, of Allestree Hall in the County of Derby, was created in the Baronetage of the United Kingdom on 18 July 1887 for Thomas William Evans. The title became extinct on his death in 1892.

The Evans Baronetcy, of Tubbendens in the parish of Farnborough in the County of Kent, was created in the Baronetage of the United Kingdom on 24 July 1902 for Sir Francis Evans, KCMG, Liberal Member of Parliament for Southampton from 1895 to 1900 and for Maidstone from 1901 to 1906. The title became extinct on the death of the third Baronet in 1970.

The Evans Baronetcy, of Wightwick near Wolverhampton in the County of Stafford, was created in the Baronetage of the United Kingdom on 31 January 1920 for the hydraulic engineer and politician Walter Evans. He was a member of the Staffordshire County Council for many years. The baronetcy was conferred upon him in honour of his services to the War Savings Committees during the First World War. The baronetcy became extinct on the death of his son, the second Baronet, in 2017.

The Evans Baronetcy, of Rottingdean in the County of Sussex, was created in the Baronetage of the United Kingdom on 21 November 1963 for Harold Evans. The title became extinct on his death in 1983.

Evans baronets, of Kilcrene (1683)
Sir William Evans, 1st Baronet (1662–1690)

Evans baronets, of Allestree Hall (1887)
Sir Thomas William Evans, 1st Baronet (1821–1892)

Evans baronets, of Tubbendens (1902)
Sir Francis Henry Evans, 1st Baronet (1840–1907)
Sir Murland de Grasse Evans, 2nd Baronet (1874–1946) – schoolfriend of Winston Churchill
Sir Evelyn Ward Evans, 3rd Baronet (1883–1970)

Evans baronets, of Wightwick (1920)
Sir Walter Harry Evans, 1st Baronet (1872–1954)
Sir Anthony Adney Evans, 2nd Baronet (1922–2017)

Evans baronets, of Rottingdean (1963)
Sir (Sidney) Harold Evans, 1st Baronet (1911–1983)

References

Kidd, Charles, Williamson, David (editors). Debrett's Peerage and Baronetage (1990 edition). New York: St Martin's Press, 1990.

Extinct baronetcies in the Baronetage of Ireland
Extinct baronetcies in the Baronetage of the United Kingdom